Labour Party leadership elections were held in the following countries in 2007:

2007 Israeli Labor Party leadership election
2007 Labour Party leadership election (Ireland)
2007 Labour Party leadership election (UK) (timeline)